Emir Majid Toufic Arslan  (February 1908 — September 18, 1983) was a Lebanese Druze leader and head of the Arslan feudal Druze ruling family. Arslan was the leader of the Yazbaki (Arslan affiliations) faction. Majid Arslan was a national political figure with a role in Lebanon's independence, a long-running Member of the Lebanese Parliament and a government minister for many times with a number of important ministerial portfolios, most notably Defense, Health, Telecommunications, Agriculture and Justice.

Personal life
Arslan was the son of Emir Toufic Arslan who helped found Greater Lebanon in 1920. He had three brothers (Nouhad, Riad, Melhem) and a sister (Zahia). Emir Majid studied at the famous French school, Mission Laïque Française.
 
In 1932, he married his cousin, Emira Lamiss Shehab. They had him two sons: Emir Toufic (1935–2003) and Emir Faysal (1941–2009).

In 1956, after his first wife’s death, Emir Majid remarried Khawla Jumblatt. They had three daughters (Zeina, Rima, and Najwa) and a son, Talal, current Head of the House of Arslan and a Druze leader. 
 
He was known for his exceptional skills in horsemanship and would often exercise his hobby in a southern village El Mageedieh (3 km²), named after him.

Political career
Throughout his political career, he had an intense rivalry with Kamal Jumblatt over the leadership amongst the Druze. He has been the longest serving Lebanese politician in a ministerial office and was elected as the Defense Minister for twenty two times.

Parliament
Emir Majid Arslan ran for parliamentary elections in 1931 and won the Druze seat of Aley Cazaa district. His allies also won the elections. From 1931 until his death in 1983, he and his allies would win all the parliamentary elections of 1934, 1937, 1943, 1947, 1951, 1953, 1957, 1960, 1964, 1968 and 1972.

Cabinet
Over a period of 35 years, Emir Majid Arslan held various ministerial posts. October 1937:     Minister of Agriculture
September 1943:   Minister of Health & Defense 
July 1944:        Minister of Health & Defense
May 1946:         Minister of Health & Defense
December 1946:    Minister of Telecommunications & Defense
June 1947:        Minister of Telecommunications & Defense       
July 1948:        Minister of Agriculture & Defense
October 1949:     Minister of Defense
February 1954:    Minister of Health & Defense
July 1955:        Minister of Defense       
March 1956:       Minister of Defense
November 1956:    Minister of Health & Minister of Agriculture
August 1957:      Minister of Telecommunications & Defense
March 1958:       Minister of Agriculture
August 1960:      Minister of Defense       
October 1961:     Minister of Defense 
October 1968:     Minister of Defense & Justice
January 1969:     Minister of Defense        
November 1969:    Minister of Defense       
May 1969:         Minister of Defense      
July 1973:        Minister of State
October 1974:     Minister of Health
July 1975:        Minister of Health & Agriculture & Housing

Lebanon's 1943 independence
Emir Majid Arslan was the leader of the independence of Lebanon in 1943 when the president Bechara El Khoury with fellow ministers were taken to prison to Rachaya by the French. After World War I, in 1918, the French established control over Lebanon by virtue of a League of Nations Mandate. In 1943, the leaders of the country together with the ministers held a national convention and drew up a National Pact stating that:
Lebanon is an independent country with an Arab aspect,
Lebanon is to be led by neither East nor West,
No to Colonialism,
Religious sects are to be represented in ministries and all governmental posts,
The Lebanese government should bring under its control customs, railways and the Regie tobacco monopoly.
The Lebanese government should supervise and control its borders.

On 10 November 1943, the French retaliated by arresting the Lebanese President Bechara El Khoury, Prime Minister Riad Solh and ministers Camille Chamoun, Adel Osseiran and Abdul Hamid Karami. The French used Senegalese mercenaries to transport these political prisoners to Rashaya Fort in the Beqaa Valley. 
Ministers Majid Arslan, Sabri Hamadeh and Habib Abi Shahla escaped the arrest because they were not in their homes that night.  One of Emir Majid's brothers also escaped to Majdel Baana to seek refuge there among members of the Abdel Khalek family as well as the Abi Jumaa's and Nasr's.

On 11 November 1943, Arslan, Hamadeh and Abi Shahla created the “Government of Free Lebanon” with Habib Abi Shahla as Prime Minister and Majid Arslan as Head of National Guard 57. Their headquarters were in Bechamoun, a village 30km from Beirut at the residences of Hussein and Youssef El Halabi (see Lebanese Independence Day). Toufic Hamdan (born February 11, 1927– died August 3, 2009) and his brother Adel Hamdan (born 1924– ) spotted the French Columns marching from the mountains of Aitate, a city on the outskirts of Ain Anoub.  Toufic and Adel Hamdan ran back and informed the men of Ain Anoub of the incoming military.  The men of Ain Anoub took up arms and blocked the road at the historic landmark, Sindyaneh.  When the French forces attempted to remove the road blocks, the battle began led by Adeeb Elbiny (?-?), Naef Soujah (1895–1944), along with his son Najib Soujah (1927 – September 24, 1981), and the only martyr of the battle, Saeed Fakhreddine (?-November 11, 1943), and many more men from Ain Anoub.  Saeed Fakhreddine climbed on top of the tank and dropped grenades into the tank, sacrificing his life to achieve victory.  The fight ensued and liberators prevailed over the French.  At that time Majid Arslan declared a Free Lebanon from the home of the Halabi family in Bechamoun where he sought refuge from the arrests.
Meanwhile, disturbances and riots raged all over Lebanon.
The Deputies held a secret session during which they drew and signed on a new flag that they handed over to the cabinet of Bechamoun.

On 21 November 1943, Due to riots, open strikes, the armed rebellion of Ain Anoub and the interference of Arab and Western states (mainly Britain), the political prisoners were released. 3
The freed prisoners passed by Bechamoun on their way back home, to thank the rebels. There, they sang the Lebanese National Anthem and Majid Arslan knelt in front of the Lebanese flag and kissed it.

On 22 November 1943, Lebanon was proclaimed an independent state.

See also
List of political families
Emir Talal Arslan
Emira Zeina Talal Arslan
Emir Shakib Arslan
Lebanese Independence Day
Lakhmids
Druze
Lebanon

References

Najib Soujah and Toufic Hamdan, Eye Witness Accounts
Jibran Jreij, Days in Rayshaya
Julia Makarem, http://www.americandruzeheritage.com/
Pierre Helou, L'Homme du Dialogue Disparait. http://www.rdl.com.lb/
Aux Origines du "Pacte National", Contribution a l'histoire de la crise Franco-Libanaise de Novembre 1943, by Maxime Rodinson 1988.
http://www.ingentaconnect.com/
Lebanon – World War II and Independence. Source: U.S. Library of Congress
Lebanon's Quest: The Road to Statehood, 1926–1939. Meir Zamir. I.B. Tauris
Ministry of National Defense (Lebanon)
http://www.syrianhistory.com/People/key/Emir+Majid+Arslan
Emir Majid Arslan Pictures at Katagogi.com
Lebanese Defense Minister Majid Arslan Chewing Cigar at Gamal Abdul Nasser's Party by Howard Sochurek at Allposters
http://www.ldparty.org/new/index.php?option=com_content&view=category&layout=blog&id=40&Itemid=55
http://www.fanoos.com/society/amir_majid_arslan.html
http://www.fanoos.com/society/talal_arslan.html

Further reading
 Eyal Zisser. Lebanon: The Challenge of Independence. I.B. Tauris. Page 116
 Marc Loris. Lebanon's Fight for Independence (1944).
 Salman Falah. The Druze in the Middle-East. Druze Research & Publications Institute, New York, USA. Pages 28–29)
 Raghid El-Solh. Lebanon and Arabism: National Identity and State Formation. I.B. Tauris. 
 Kamal Salibi. A House of Many Mansions: The History of Lebanon Reconsidered.
 Federal Research Division. Lebanon: A Country Study.

1908 births
1983 deaths
People from Aley District
Majid
Defense ministers of Lebanon
Lebanese Druze
Lebanese princes
Health ministers of Lebanon
Members of the Parliament of Lebanon